The Tanga Entrance Lighthouse is located in Tanga Region in northeastern Tanzania.

See also

 List of lighthouses in Tanzania

References

External links
 Tanzania Ports Authority

Lighthouses in Tanzania
Buildings and structures in Tanga, Tanzania